The following are the national records in speed skating in Canada maintained by Speed Skating Canada.

Men

Women

References

External links
 Speed Skating Canada web site

National records in speed skating
Speed skating-related lists
Speed skating
Records
Speed skating